The 1902–03 season was the eighth competitive season in Belgian football.

Overview
Only one official division existed at the time, split into two leagues.  It was called Coupe de Championnat (Championship Cup) and its winner was decided after a final round between the first two of each league.  The season was not completed.

Olympia Club de Bruxelles and Daring Club de Bruxelles were admitted to the league at the end of the season while Verviers F.C. merged with Stade Wallon de Verviers to become C.S. Verviétois.

Honour

League standings

Championship Cup A

Championship Cup B

[Note 1] Merged with Stade Wallon de Verviers to become C.S. Verviétois.

Final round

External links
RSSSF archive - Final tables 1895-2002
Belgian clubs history